Katyrina is a rural locality in Katyrinsky Selsoviet Rural Settlement, Oktyabrsky District, Kursk Oblast, Russia. Population:

Geography 
The village is located on the Seym River (a left tributary of the Desna), 66 km from the Russia–Ukraine border, 24 km south-west of Kursk, 8 km west of the district center – the urban-type settlement Pryamitsyno, 2 km from the selsoviet center – Mitrofanova.

 Climate
Katyrina has a warm-summer humid continental climate (Dfb in the Köppen climate classification).

Transport 
Katyrina is located 18.5 km from the federal route  Crimea Highway (a part of the European route ), on the road of regional importance  (Kursk – Lgov – Rylsk – border with Ukraine), 2.5 km from the nearest railway halt 433 km (railway line Lgov I — Kursk).

The rural locality is situated 35 km from Kursk Vostochny Airport, 124 km from Belgorod International Airport and 238 km from Voronezh Peter the Great Airport.

References

Notes

Sources

Rural localities in Oktyabrsky District, Kursk Oblast